Palatino is a family of typefaces.

Palatino may also refer to:

 Palatino Express, a passenger train, formerly called the Rome Express, operating from 1890
 Palatine Hill, also called Palatino, the centermost of the Seven Hills of Rome

People with the surname
Giovanni Battista Palatino (c. 1515 – c. 1575), Italian calligrapher
Raymond Palatino, Filipino activist

See also
Palatine (disambiguation)